Igal Volodarsky, also known as Igal Dar (יגאל וולדרסקי; June 12, 1936 - June 15, 1977), was an Israeli basketball player. He played in the Israel Basketball Premier League, and for the Israeli national basketball team.

Biography
He played in the Israel Basketball Premier League. He competed for 21 years for Maayan Baruch, Ashdot Yaakov, Hapoel Haifa, Hapoel Nir David, Kiryat Haim, and Hapoel Megiddo. 

He also played for the Israeli national basketball team.  He competed in the 1959 European Championship for Men, 1961 European Championship for Men, 1964 European Olympic Qualifying Tournament for Men, 1965 European Championship for Men, 1966 Asian Games (winning a gold medal),  1967 European Championship for Men, and 1968 European Olympic Qualifying Tournament for Men.

References 

1936 births
1977 deaths
Israeli men's basketball players
Hapoel Haifa B.C. players
Israeli Basketball Premier League players
Basketball players at the 1966 Asian Games
Asian Games medalists in basketball
Asian Games gold medalists for Israel
Medalists at the 1966 Asian Games